Galop Island is an uninhabited island in the Saint Lawrence River located in St. Lawrence County, northeast of Ogdensburg, New York. The  island is owned by the New York Power Authority and managed by the New York State Office of Parks, Recreation and Historic Preservation as the undeveloped Galop Island State Park.

Galop Island has historically been known by a variety of names, including Isle Aux Galloup, Gallou Island, Butternut Island, Dillingham Island, Dixon Island, Lalone Island, Lotus Island, Round Island, Sears Island, Tick Island, and Twin Island.

Wildlife habitat
The island contains a mixture of shrubs, open areas and mature forests. It is a known wintering area for bald eagles. A nearby area of the Saint Lawrence River, known as the Galop Island Pools, remains free of ice during the winter due to strong river currents and turbulence. The availability of open water during the winter is limited within the region; only three other areas within the Saint Lawrence River remain similarly free of ice.

Approximately  of shallow bays along the river channel south of the island include spawning habitat for muskellunge, causing the area to be a regionally important sport fishing destination. The large, protected, shallow bays with variable water velocities found offshore from Galop Island are rare within the region. The bays additionally support migratory waterfowl during the spring and fall, and additional fish species, including brown bullhead, smallmouth bass, and yellow perch, are abundant.

See also
List of New York state parks

References

Protected areas of St. Lawrence County, New York
Islands of New York (state)
Islands of St. Lawrence County, New York
Islands of the Saint Lawrence River
Uninhabited islands of New York (state)
River islands of New York (state)
Parks in St. Lawrence County, New York
State parks of New York (state)